The Centre for Post-Graduate Studies (CPGS) is functioning under Orissa University of Agriculture and Technology in Odisha, India.  It offers four courses, MBA in Agribusiness Management (ABM), Master in Bioinformatics, Master in Computer Application (MCA) and Master of Science in Microbiology.

Orissa University of Agriculture and Technology (OUAT) Bhubaneswar, India is a multi faculty technical university.

Description 
The campus is located near Siripur Square, Bhubaneswar, in front of the University Administrative building. It has three spacious buildings with an adequate number of classrooms, laboratories, library and seminar rooms accessible to all three departments.

History 
The college came into existence in 1998 through an initiative of OUAT.

See also 
OUAT homepage
Dept. of Computer Application homepage
Bioinformatics Alumni Association (BIOALUMNAS) homepage

References 

Education in Bhubaneswar
1988 establishments in Orissa
Educational institutions established in 1988
Universities and colleges in Odisha